The Miss Mundo Dominicana 2003 pageant was held on September 19, 2002, with only 40 candidates competing for the national crown. The chosen winner represented the Dominican Republic at the Miss World 2003. The pageant selected three delegates from each six regions that would make it top 18. Then two delegates were elected from each region. Then they chose a delegate from each region and would get sashed with the name of the region and automatically were in the Final 6.

Results

Miss Mundo Dominicana 2003 : María Eugenia Vargas García (Santiago)
1st Runner-up   : Elizabeth Rondón (Dajabón)
2nd Runner-up   : María Guzmán (Moca, Dominican Republic)
3rd Runner-up   : Suanny Frotaán (Com. Dom. NY)
4th Runner-up   : Milka Ramos (La Altagracia)
5th Runner-up   : Elizabeth Matos (Distrito Nacional)

Top 12

Dayani Altagracia Jiménez (La Romana)
Alicia Oviedo (Samaná)
Eva Cuello (Peravia)
Oliva de Soto (El Seibo)
Mariasela Esmero (Com. Dom. Canada)
Tatiana Vargas (San Juan)

Top 18

Roselkys Tavarez (Com. Dom. Rhode Island)
Milly Grono (Puerto Plata)
Bárbara Gómez (María Trinidad Sánchez)
Elisa Mayos (Monte Plata)
Denise Rivera (Independencia)
Alisa Castaño (San Pedro de Macorís)

Special awards
 Miss Photogenic (voted by press reporters) - María Guzmán(Moca, Dominican Republic)
 Miss Congeniality (voted by Miss Dominican Republic Universe contestants) - Maria Guzman (Moca, Dominican Republic)
 Best Face - Maria Guzman (Moca, Dominican Republic)
 Best Provincial Costume - Margarita Rosario (Santiago Rodríguez)
 Best Hair - Elixandra Tobias (San Cristóbal)
 Miss Elegancia - Odalisse Meran (Azua)
 Miss Amistad - Dayani Altagracia Jiménez (La Romana)

Miss Dominican Regions

Miss Region del Cibao Occidental : Elizabeth Rondón (Dajabón)
Miss Region del Cibao Oriental : María Vargas (Sánchez Ramírez)
Miss Region del El Valle de Enriquillo : María Alejandra Guzmán (Pedernales)
Miss Region del Exterior : Suanny Frotaán (Com. Dom. NY)
Miss Region del Higüamo : Milka Ramos (La Altagracia)
Miss Region del Ozama : Elizabeth Matos (Distrito Nacional)

Delegates

Trivia
Suanny Frotaan entered in Miss Dom. Rep. Universe 2003 being placed 3rd runner-up, and later winning Miss Rep. Dom. Tierra 2003.
 These delegates entered Miss Dominican Republic Universe 2003:  (Com. Dom. NY), (Dajabón), (La Altagracia), (María Trinidad Sánchez), (Santiago)
Elizabeth Rondón, Miss Dajabón would enter Miss Dominican Republic Universe 2005 and become a semifinalist.
Odalise Meran is the sister of Miss Azua in Miss Dominican Republic Universe 2003.

Miss Dominican Republic
2003 beauty pageants
2003 in the Dominican Republic